The 1917 Arizona Wildcats football team represented the University of Arizona as an independent during the 1917 college football season. In their fourth season under head coach Pop McKale, the Wildcats compiled a 3–2 record and outscored all opponents, 118 to 41. The team captain was William Rose McGowen.

Schedule

References

Arizona
Arizona Wildcats football seasons
Arizona Wildcats football